In quantum mechanics, the case of a particle in a one-dimensional ring is similar to the particle in a box. The Schrödinger equation for a free particle which is restricted to a semicircle (technically, whose configuration space is the circle ) is

Wave function 

Using cylindrical coordinates on the 1-dimensional semicircle, the wave function depends only on the angular coordinate, and so

Substituting the Laplacian in cylindrical coordinates, the wave function is therefore expressed as

Basically

Since the wave function , the coefficient A must equal 0 because .  The wave function also equals 0 at  so we must apply this boundary condition.  Discarding the trivial solution where B=0, the wave function  only when m is an integer since . This boundary condition quantizes the energy where the energy equals  where m is any integer.  The condition m=0 is ruled out because  everywhere, meaning that the particle is not in the potential at all.  Negative integers are also ruled out since they can easily be absorbed in the normalization condition.

We then normalize the wave function, yielding a result where .  The normalized wave function is

Analysis
Since the wave function is only dependent on the azimuthal angle , the measurable quantities of the system are the angular position and angular momentum, expressed with the operators  and  respectively.

The commutation and uncertainty relations for angular position and angular momentum are given as follows:

Boundary conditions
As with all quantum mechanics problems, if the boundary conditions are changed so does the wave function.

The wave equation for such a potential is given as:

Similarly, if the semicircular potential well is a finite well, the solution will resemble that of the finite potential well where the angular operators  and  replace the linear operators x and p.

See also
 Particle in a ring
 Particle in a box
 Finite potential well
 Delta function potential
 Gas in a box
 Particle in a spherically symmetric potential

Quantum models
Quantum mechanical potentials